The office of Lord Lieutenant of West Yorkshire was created on 1 April 1974.

Kenneth Hargreaves: 1 April 1974 – 1978 (previously West Riding Lieutenant since 1970)
Sir William Bulmer: 1978–1985
John Taylor, Baron Ingrow: 1985–1992
John Lyles: 25 September 1992 – 2004
Dame Ingrid Roscoe, : 2004–1 September 2018
Edmund Anderson: 3 September 2018–present

External links
Lieutenancy web page

References

Yorkshire, West
 
1974 establishments in England